James Paul Bouley (born 1966) is an American politician. He serves as the mayor of Concord, New Hampshire.

Bouley's father, Dick, is a lobbyist who worked for Governor Hugh Gallen in the late 1970s. Bouley graduated from the University of New Hampshire in 1988.

Bouley moved to Concord in 1984. He was elected to the Concord City Council representing Ward 10 in 1997. In 2007, he was elected mayor of Concord. Bouley cited the opioid/methamphetamine crisis as the most pressing issue in the city. He prioritized Interstate 93's design to make sure it was in the best interest of the city, as well as development along Stickney Avenue. Bouley presided over a $15 million dollar revitalization of the downtown area, and he received the Business Leader of the Year Award by the Concord Chamber of Commerce in 2017. He supported refugee resettlement in Concord, as the city received the most refugees in New Hampshire. He criticized racist messages that appeared on a Somali family's home and supports diversity in the city. Bouley voted against a large apartment complex by Dol-Soul Properties in August 2019.

Alongside former Republican National Committeeman Mike Dennehy, Bouley runs an influential government affairs firm. Bouley endorsed Hillary Clinton for president in 2016 and Cory Booker in the 2020 primaries. Bouley is Concord's longest-serving mayor and was re-elected to his seventh term in November 2019, receiving 3,901 votes to Linda Banfill's 994.

References

External links
Mayor Jim Bouley

1966 births
21st-century American politicians
Living people
Mayors of Concord, New Hampshire
New Hampshire Democrats
University of New Hampshire alumni